The Embassy of Botswana in Washington, D.C. is the Republic of Botswana's diplomatic mission to the United States. It is located at 1531 New Hampshire Avenue, Northwest, Washington, D.C., in the Dupont Circle neighborhood. 

Since 2020, Kitso Mokaila has been the ambassador.

Building
The building was constructed in 1887 for diplomat, attorney, and author Simon Wolf. It's a contributing property to the Dupont Circle Historic District, and valued at $2,266,160. Notable owners have included William F. Aldrich, Thomas H. Anderson, Thomas Leiter (son of Levi Leiter) and the National Active and Retired Federal Employees Association.

See also 

 Botswana–United States relations
 United States Ambassador to Botswana

References

External links

Official website
wikimapia

Botswana
Washington, D.C.
Botswana–United States relations
Dupont Circle